Kannabis-sakene refers to the series of criminal cases where illegal cannabis plantations were discovered in Norway in 2007 and 2008. The case was eventually one of Norway's largest narcotics cases.

Background 
In November 2007, firefighters responding to a call stumbled upon a large cannabis farm in Enger in Søndre Land, Oppland. Thus began the investigation of what was later assessed as a large drug network for the cannabis production.

Kripos, stated that

Investigation 
Anders said in a press release in February 2008 that the agency "has a national responsibility for investigating drug related crimes, and has since the end of January become involved with investigating the cannabis plantation cases. – We're looking at what connections there are there between for firms and enterprises among the different cases, the connections for firms and enterprises that are abroad, and on the ringleaders and the network behind it, according to the head of the tactical department for investigation Anders Atle Roll-Matthiesen. A 5 March preliminary meeting was held between the involved police districts and National Criminal Investigation Service (Kripos) to discuss whether the investigation should be centralized.

The Norwegian security agency Kripos stated that the cases and plantations could probably be connected to the ringleaders abroad. There are commonalities related to both: ties to the Vietnamese-Norwegian community, and the common way in which the plantations are built and supplied with electricity. Both the equipment and the methods that were used in the system, and theft of electricity, the properties have similarities in many cases throughout the country.

The Norwegian police stated that they believe that the case has links to other countries, and mentioned England, the Netherlands and Canada as well as Norway's neighboring countries, Sweden and Denmark. Danish police attended a coordination meeting at Kripos in Oslo on 5 March.

Cases 
The table below is an overview of the findings associated with the case. As of April 2008, not all the cases had been compiled.

Charges and prosecution 
By March 2008, 80 persons suspected of crimes had been charged in the case for the cultivation of the narcotic plant, and over 40 of them remanded. Nine different police districts: (Follo, Gudbrandsdal, Hedmark, Oslo, Romerike, Søndre Buskerud, Vestfold, Vestoppland and Østfold) and Anders were cooperating in the case.

On 3 April, it became known that the police suspected the owner of a chain of stores, believing that he had ties with the many cannabis farms that had been discovered. He was arrested together with four other people, when the police uncovered 500 cannabis plants on a farm he owned in Enebakk in February. Furthermore, his phone number was found in the contacts of several other indicted in connection with the other cannabis findings in other locations, though the suspect denied the charges.

References

External links 
 Morgenbladet: Plantations in the Eastern regions, Where do the Norwegian marihuanaplantasjene in the established narkotikaøkonomien? By Sveinung Sandberg, Christine Viland, Willy Pedersen.

Cannabis in Norway
2008 in Norway
2008 in cannabis
Law enforcement in Norway
Anti-cannabis operations